Teston is a village in the civil parish of Barming in the Maidstone District of Kent, England.

Teston may also refer to:

 Teston, Vaughan, Ontario, Canada
 Teston d'argent, a currency used in France during the Middle Ages; see Livre tournois

See also
 
 Testoni (disambiguation)